A flagship is a vessel used by the commanding officer of a group of naval ships.

Flagship may also refer to:

Arts, entertainment, and media
 Flagship (band), an alt-rock band from Charlotte, NC, US
 Flagship (album)
 Flagship (broadcasting), the originating broadcast for a broadcast network, radio show, or TV show
 Flagship (magazine), a former UK magazine specializing in postal and other games

Brands and enterprises
 Flagship (company), a Japanese video game developer
 Endeavor Air (former callsign: Flagship) 
 Flagship Airlines, a regional airline in Nashville, Tennessee, US
 Flagship Studios, an American video game developer

Other uses
 Flagship product, a core product or product representative of other products in that product line
 Flagship store